Kenneth Marshall (born June 27, 1950) is an American actor.

Early life 
Marshall graduated from Saint Joseph High School in Saint Joseph, Michigan, in 1968. After playing violin in high school for musicals, Marshall tried his luck on stage, and was cast as Curley in his senior year's production of Oklahoma!

He went on to earn his bachelor's degree in pre-med/English literature, and master's in drama from the University of Michigan.

Career 
After graduating, Marshall then spent four years in the drama department at The Juilliard School with the likes of Kelsey Grammer and Robin Williams.

While at Juilliard, he had his first professional experience with Joseph Papp's Shakespeare in the Park and spent the next 14 years in New York City doing theater, film and TV, including being cast as Tony in the first Broadway revival of West Side Story. He appeared in The Tempest with Anthony Hopkins in 1979.

In television, he played the title role in Giuliano Montaldo's 1982 television miniseries Marco Polo and portrayed the character Michael Eddington in the television series Star Trek: Deep Space Nine from 1994 until 1997.

Although appearing in such films such as Tilt (1979), The Skin (1981), and Feds (1988), he is perhaps best known for the starring role as Prince/King Colwyn in the fantasy adventure movie, Krull (1983). After a permanent move to L.A., he spent several seasons at the Old Globe Theater in San Diego in the world premiere of Stephen Metcalfe's Emily, his musical White Linen, and Stephen Sondheim's Into the Woods.

Personal life 
He lives with his wife, Linda, who also graduated in 1968 from Saint Joseph High School. The couple have two children, Amanda and Allen.  He was inducted to the SJHS Performing Arts Center Hall of Fame in 2019.

Acting credits

Filmography

Theatre

References

External links 
 

1950 births
American male film actors
American male television actors
Living people
Male actors from New York City
University of Michigan alumni